"Nothing to Lose" is the second single from album Soulcrusher by the hard rock band Operator was written by frontman Johnny Strong and bass player Wade Carpenter. Also the song is the second track on the album. The band made a video for this song included tour performance and tour backstages and showing the band in their other playgrounds. The band filmed a second music video that featured the band performing in a warehouse with red lights and with various images appearing on screens behind them. This version received moderate airtime on MTV2.

Appearances
The song featured on the soundtrack of Burnout Paradise and the song was TNA Wrestling 2008 PPV event Lockdown's official theme song.

Chart position
The song peaked at No. 23 on the Billboard Mainstream Rock chart.

References

2008 singles
American hard rock songs
2007 songs
Atlantic Records singles